The 2013 Campeonato Tocantinense was the 21st edition of the Tocantins' top professional football league. The competition began on March 2, and ended on June 8. Interporto won the championship by the 2nd time, while Tocantins and Guaraí were relegated.

Format
On the first stage, there are two rounds. Each round is a round-robin. The two best teams in each round advances to the round's final, so the winner of the round can be determined.

On the final stage, each round winner plays in the final. If the same team wins both round, that team is the champion.

Qualifications
The champion qualifies to the 2014 Copa do Brasil.

Participating teams

First round

Standings

Results

Finals

Second round

Standings

Results

Finals

Final stage

Interporto is the champion of the 2013 Campeonato Tocantinense.

Final standings

References

Tocantinense
2013